Cine21 is a South Korean film magazine issued by Hangyeore newspaper. The magazine was first published on 24 April 1995 in Seoul, and subsequent issues have continued to be released weekly. The first editor-in-chief was Seon-hee Cho, the culture desk journalist. The first issue was published with the articles including "Who is controlling Korean film industry", "The vote of 'Korean film power 50'". 1 August 2003, Cine21 was spun off from the Hangyeore Newspaper and became an independent subsidiary (corporate name: Cine21 Corporation) of the former. As of 2019, the Hankyoreh Media Group owns 85% of the company's shares.

History 
Cine21 was the first weekly film magazine published in South Korea. It was born out of the Hankyoreh Media Group's broader goal of promoting meaningful cultural pursuits on a variety of media platforms following the democratic uprising of 1987.

Editor-in-chief 
 Cho, Seon-hee (14 April 1995 – May 2000)
 An, Jung-sook (May 2000 – October 2002)
 Heo, Moon-yung (October 2002 – July 2003)
 Kim, So-hee (July 2003 – March 2005)
 Nam, Dong-chul (26 March 2005 – 500th issue)
 Ko, Gyung-tae
 Moon, Suk
 Lee, Young-jin
 Joo, Sung-chul 
 Chang, Yeong-yeop (Present)

Cine21 and Korean film magazine market 
The two monthly film magazines, "Kino", issued its first number in May 1995, and "Premiere", got license permission from United States in December 1995, triggered Korean film magazine market boom. Before the two magazines, there were "Screen", issued its first number March 1984, and "Road Show". In October 1999, weekly film magazine "Preview" was published, however, it disappears after the 4th issue. The film magazine market transformed its type as a weekly magazine from monthly magazine through the appearance of "Cine Bus", issued its first number on 2 September 2000, and "Film 2.0" started on 19 December 2000. In the year 2001, "Movie Week" set their price to 1000 Won and centered public's attention. The weekly magazines became active throughout the market, however, the monthly magazines kept on downsizing. To the last, the first movie magazine "Kino" has ceased publication in 2003 and "Road Show" also discontinued in 2003. "Premiere" changed its type to two-weekly publishing magazine. The only monthly film magazine "Screen" discontinued in 2010, December. "Movie Week" merged with "Magazine M", running by Joongang Newspaper, one of the biggest press in Korea. Nowadays, only one film magazine is on the road : "Cine21".

Distribution 
100,000 copies of Cine21 are released per week across South Korea. The magazine has additionally expanded to online platforms that allow for a wider audience and diversity of content.

Cine21 Co. 
In 2003, Cine21 Co. was established as its own entertainment media company within the Hankyoreh Media Group. This allowed the magazine to broaden its networking power within the film industry.

Cine21i Co. 
In 2007, Cine21i Co. was established as a film distribution company within the Hankyoreh Media Group. The company created an online platform that allows digital film files to be downloaded and distributed legally. This helped to revitalize the South Korean film industry.

Impact 
Cine21 has impacted and contributed to the South Korean film industry as a whole. It has specifically created a unique space for the youth perspective.

Others
Cine21 is one of the stakeholders of film distributor Little Big Pictures.

References

External links 
 <씨네21> 10년, 한국영화 10년 500호, 2005년 5월 4일자
 <씨네21>에 돌을 던져라 501호, 2005년 5월 10일자
 한국영화 초고속성장 지켜본 10년…영화주간지 ‘성공사례’ 의 주역 창간 10돌 남동철 편집장 인터뷰, 한겨레 신문, 2005년 5월 1일

1995 establishments in South Korea
Film magazines
The Hankyoreh
Korean-language mass media
Liberal media in South Korea
Magazines established in 1995
Mass media in Seoul
Magazines published in South Korea
Weekly magazines